The River Twiss is a river in the county of Yorkshire, England. The source of the river is Kingsdale Beck which rises at Kingsdale Head at the confluence of Back Gill and Long Gill in the Yorkshire Dales. Beneath Keld Head, it changes its name to the River Twiss. It has two notable waterfalls, Thornton Force and Pecca Falls, and its course follows part of the Ingleton Waterfalls Walk, then through Swilla Glen to Thornton in Lonsdale and down to Ingleton, where it meets the River Doe to form the River Greta.

The English landscape artist J. M. W. Turner was a frequent visitor to the area and his sketch of Thornton Force in 1816 is currently part of the Tate collection.

Course

From the caves below Keld Head there is a flow of water that joins Kingsdale Beck to form the River Twiss. It flows south over Thornton Force and Pecca Falls and through woodland to join the River Doe at Ingleton.

Waterfalls

Pecca Falls has three drops totalling  that fall into their own deep pools.

Geology

In its upper part the river runs through a valley cut into horizontal beds of Carboniferous Great Scar limestone.  At Thornton Force it crosses a notable unconformity into the underlying, steeply inclined Ordovician greywackes. The unconformity is clearly visible in the face of the waterfall.  The Ordovician strata influence the character of the steep and narrow Swilla Glen and its waterfalls until, just north of Ingleton, the river crosses the Craven Fault and onto Carboniferous Limestone once again.

Crossings

 Ravenray Bridge (foot)
 Pecca Bridge (foot)
 Manor Bridge (foot)
 Unnamed Road, Ingleton

Gallery

Sources

Ordnance Survey Open Data https://www.ordnancesurvey.co.uk/business-government/tools-support/open-data-support

References

Rivers of North Yorkshire
2Twiss